Hans Syvert Jacobsen (3 August 1836 – 28 June 1901) was a Norwegian politician for the Liberal Party.

He was elected to the Parliament of Norway in 1898, representing the constituency of Flekkefjord. He worked as a merchant there. He served only one term. He was mayor of Flekkefjord in 1889.

References

1836 births
1901 deaths
Members of the Storting
Liberal Party (Norway) politicians
Mayors of places in Vest-Agder
People from Flekkefjord
Norwegian merchants
19th-century Norwegian businesspeople